Saint Pacian (Pacianus) ( 310–391 AD) was a bishop of Barcelona during the fourth century.  He was bishop from about 365 AD to 391 AD, succeeding Praetextatus (Pretextat), who had attended a church council at Sardica in 347 AD and who is the first recorded bishop of Barcelona.

Considered a Father of the Church, Pacian is eulogized in Jerome's De viris illustribus, in which Jerome praises his eloquence, learning, chastity, and holiness of life.

His writings are extant only in part in three letters and a short treatise, Paraenesis ad Poenitentiam.  In his writings, he discussed ecclesiastical discipline, baptism, papal primacy, and teachings on penance against Novatianism, which was then flourishing in Spain.  He is also remembered from a phrase from one of his letters: Christianus mihi nomen est, catholicus vero cognomen ("My name is Christian, my surname is Catholic.").  

Pacian was married and had a son, Nummius Aemilianus Dexter, who served under Theodosius I as proconsul and praetorian prefect. Jerome did not know Pacian personally, but knew Pacian's son, to whom De Viris Illustribus is dedicated.

Notes

External links

 The Extant Works of S. Pacian
Episcopologi de la catedral 

Catalan Roman Catholic saints
Saints from Hispania
Bishops of Barcelona
4th-century bishops in Hispania
4th-century Latin writers
391 deaths
Church Fathers
Latin letter writers
4th-century Christian saints
310 births